Behabad is a city in Yazd Province, Iran.

Behabad or Bahabad may also refer to various places in Iran:
 Bahabad, Kerman
 Behabad-e Qobasiah, Kermanshah Province
 Behabad-e Saleh, Kermanshah Province
 Behabad, Chenaran, Razavi Khorasan Province
 Behabad, Gonabad, Razavi Khorasan Province
 Behabad, South Khorasan
 Behabad County, in Yazd Province